San Salvador el Verde (municipality) is a town and municipality in Puebla in south-eastern Mexico. It is best known as the site of the Chautla Hacienda, which was the property of Eulogio Gillow, the first archbishop of Antequera (city of Oaxaca) and contains an English style residence called locally called "El Castillo" (The Castle). The facility today is run as a recreation center.

References

Municipalities of Puebla